José Martins Achiam (1944–2008) was a Portuguese born in Macau.

He is the founder and the father of Macau Karatedo and Seigokan Macau.

Student of Yukiaki Yoki (Seigokan Sensei at Hong Kong), he introduced Karatedo to Macau in 1967.
He traveled every week between Hong Kong and Macau in 1966/67 to gain more knowledge in Karate.
His father worked in the Macau Judiciary Police officials.
During 40 years in Macau, he vigorously developed karate and promote Macao Karate in the international karate community to achieve a certain position. 
In the Macau Karate sector his nickname was the "Master", the "Father of Karate".

In 1970, Mr. Achiam played in Tokyo on behalf of Hong Kong to hold its first session of the World Karate Championships (WUKO I).

In 1994, he vigorously promote Macau to unite the various schools of Karate and then, when the Macao Karatedo Association (AKM) was established, he became its founding president re-elected since the term of office to vigorously promote karate and done efforts to increase the overall level, so in recent years, Macau Karate in a number of international competitions, is repeatedly winning.

In the 90's Jose Achiam began to participate in international affairs, has been elected as Secretary-General of the Asian Karatedo Federation (AKF) and for the Executive Committee of the World Karate Federation (WKF). His term of office was awarded by WKF assigned specifically to help China's accession to WKF. In July 2006 chaired the first training of karate Coaches of the Chinese Karatedo Association. J.M.Achiam term of office the Secretary-General on the AKF Asian Games in Seoul, to strive to karate as a sport and eventually succeeded in the Asian Games karate officially became a permanent sport. Earlier in 2008, Mr. Achiam has been named for the Macao Sports Committee.

Mr. Achiam was father of two sons and two daughters. His young daughter, Mariana Vargas Achiam, competed several times in Macau and in Japan Karate Championships and won consecutively in 1st, 2nd and 3rd places. She also competed in 2008 on behalf of Macau, held in Sabah, the Ninth AKF Asian Youth, Junior Karate Championships. And in 2009, Mariana represented Macau and competed in the World Karate Championship in Morocco, Rabat. 

His third son, José Luís Pedruco Achiam had in 1998, the Asian Youth, Junior Karate Championships and in the 15-year-old team won the silver medal from his hand.

On September 16, 2008 due to a severe stroke was admitted to hospital, until he died at 11:00 September 23, 2008. Mr. Achiam had 40 years of active contribution in karate.

References
- "Yoki´s Karate Errantry in America" by Yukiaki Yoki (2001); Betty D.Greenberg Edition 

- "Seigokan Golden Book" by JKS; Limited Edition of Japan Karatedo Seigokan (Out of Print)

- "Karaté-Do Seigokan em Macau - Uma Longa História de Sucessos"; Edition of Macao Regional Government (1991) (Out of Print)

- "Achiam´s Biography" by Bill K.S.Mok; Article 

- "Tai Chung Pou" Newspaper 

- "Jornal Tribuna de Macau" Newspaper 

- "Macao Government Sports Institute"

- "Asian Karatedo Federation Official Website"

- "World Karate Federation (WKF) death's official news"

External links
Macau Seigokan

1944 births
2008 deaths
Macau male karateka
Gōjū-ryū practitioners
Karate coaches
Macanese people